The Sunshine League is a high school athletic league that is part of the CIF Southern Section. Members are independent high schools in Los Angeles.

Member schools
 Flintridge Sacred Heart Academy (La Cañada)
 Immaculate Heart High School (Los Feliz)
 Louisville High School (Woodland Hills)
 Marlborough High School (Hancock Park)
 Marymount High School (Bel Air)
 Notre Dame Academy (Los Angeles)

References

CIF Southern Section leagues